Noyelles-sous-Bellonne (literally Noyelles under Bellonne) is a commune in the Pas-de-Calais department in the Hauts-de-France region of France.

Geography

Population

Places of interest
 The church of St.Pétronille, rebuilt along with the rest of the village, after World War I.

See also
Communes of the Pas-de-Calais department

References

External links

 Official website of the commune 

Noyellessousbellonne